The Minnesota Nurses Association (MNA) is a labor union representing 22,000 registered nurses in the U.S. state of Minnesota.  MNA represents the majority of bedside nurses in the state of Minnesota, as well as nurses in Wisconsin and Iowa. They are affiliated with National Nurses United, a national nurses union promoting guaranteed nurse-to-patient staffing ratios and single payer healthcare.

On June 10, 2010, the MNA staged a one-day walkout strike to protest wage freezes and pension decreases, and to advocate for guaranteed nurse-to-patient staffing ratios. The MNA said it was the largest nurses strike in United States history, with more than 12,000 union members involved. On the morning of September 12, 2022, the MNA started staging a three-day strike involving around 15,000 nurses working in Minnesota across 16 hospitals over staffing shortages, being overworked, and low wages, making it the largest strike of nurses in the private sector in American history.

References

External links
Minnesota Nurses Association
National Nurses United

Trade unions in Minnesota
State wide trade unions in the United States
National Nurses United
Medical and health organizations based in Minnesota